Wild!Life Adventures: Wildlife Vet is a 1998 Made-for-TV documentary film directed by Larry Engel. It composed by Marc Engel and story editor was Whitney Wood. It stars Alicia Silverstone and veterinarian Dave Jessup. In this 60-minute longer documentary, Silverstone joins Jessup as he treats animal ailments in Zimbabwe and also in California.

External links 
 TCM page

1998 films
1990s English-language films
American documentary television films
Veterinary reality television series
Documentary films about nature
1998 documentary films
1990s American films